Bijon Bhattacharya (17 July 1906 – 19 January 1978) was an Indian theatre and film actor from West Bengal. He was an eminent playwright and dramatist.

Bhattacharya was born in 1906 at Faridpur (now in Bangladesh) to a Hindu, Bengali Brahmin family, and was an early witness to the destitution and penury of the peasantry of that land. He became a member of the Indian People's Theatre Association (IPTA).

Personal life
Bijon Bhattacharya married the Jnanpith Award-winning Bengali writer, Mahasweta Devi. Their only son Nabarun Bhattacharya, a Bengali writer, was born in 1948.

Works

Dramas 
 Agun
 Nabanna (Fresh Harvest) (1944)
 Jabanbandi (Confession)
 Kalanka
 Mara Chand (Dead Moon) (1951)
 Gotrantar (Change of Lineage) (1959)
 Debi Garjan (Shouting of the Goddess) (1966)
 Garbhabati Janani (Pregnant Mother) (1969)
 Krishnapaksha
 Aj Basanta
 Chalo Sagare
 Lash Ghuirya Jauk
 Aborodh
 Krishnapaksha
 Jionkanya
 Hanskhalir Hans

Films 
 Tathapi (1950)
 Chinnamul (1950)
 Meghe Dhaka Tara (1960)
 Komal Gandhar (1961)
 Kashtipathar (1964)
 Subarnarekha (1965)
 Swapna Niye (1966)
 Kamallata (1969)
 Padatik (1973)
 Jukti Takko Aar Gappo (1977)
 Bhola Moira (1977)
 Swati (1977)
 Dooratwa (1979)
 Sharey Chuattor (1953)

References

External links 
 
Interview with Mahashweta Devi

1906 births
1978 deaths
Bengali writers
Male actors from Kolkata
Bengali male actors
Bengali Hindus
Indian Hindus
Male actors in Bengali cinema
Indian People's Theatre Association people
Indian male dramatists and playwrights
People from Faridpur District
University of Calcutta alumni
20th-century Indian male actors
20th-century Indian dramatists and playwrights
Writers from Kolkata
Dramatists and playwrights from West Bengal
20th-century Indian male writers
Recipients of the Sangeet Natak Akademi Award